Phyllonorycter baetica is a moth of the family Gracillariidae. It is found in Spain and France.

The larvae feed on members of the genus Genista including G. lobelii, G. cinerascens and G. versicolor. They mine the stem and thorns of their host plant.

References

External links
Fauna Europaea

Moths described in 2006
baetica
Moths of Europe